Manning Airport  is located  northwest of Manning, Alberta, Canada.

References

External links
Place to Fly on COPA's Places to Fly airport directory

Certified airports in Alberta
County of Northern Lights